Lost Cat Corona is a 2017 American comedy film written and directed by Anthony Tarsitano. The film stars Ralph Macchio, Gina Gershon, Paul Sorvino and Sean Young with David Zayas, Summer Crockett Moore and Anthony Ruivivar in supporting roles.
A play-it-safe guy (Ralph Macchio) must search for his wife's (Gina Gershon) missing cat, bringing him face-to-face with the colorful, wacky, and sometimes, the more dangerous element of his neighborhood, forcing him to confront his fears and rethink his M.O.

Cast

 Sean Young as Roxie
 Ralph Macchio as Dominic
 Gina Gershon as Connie
 Jeff Kober as Sue
 Kathrine Narducci as Nora
 Paul Sorvino as Uncle Sam
 David Zayas as Ponce
 Barbara Rosenblat as Connie's Mom
 Karina Arroyave as Lucia
 John D'Leo as Teenage Dom
 Adam Ferrara as Sal
 Tom Wopat as Jimmy Pipes
 Anthony Ruivivar as Guillermo
 Michael McGlone as Johnny the Funeral Director
 Ajay Naidu as Amir
 Sondra James as Sal's Mother
 Anthony Mangano as Dominic Sr.
 Antoinette LaVecchia as Dom's Mom
 Liza Colón-Zayas as Jasmine
 Warren Bub as Construction Worker
 Pernell Walker as Sales Clerk
 Ana Isabelle as Betty
 Mike Carlsen as Officer Krammer
 James Andrew O'Connor as Lawnmower Larry
 Gaston Dalmau as himself (as Gastón Dalmau)
 Michael Di Rezze as Young Dom
 Ali Ahn as Edie
 Stacia Crawford as Maria
 Aaron Dalla Villa as Richie
 Gail R. Lawrence as Bar Patron
 Gino Cafarelli as Al
 Summer Crockett Moore as Jackie
 Juan Castano as Badass Kid
 Jenson Smith as Disco Girl
 José Ramón Rosario as Bartender
 Lou Carbonneau as Emil
 Juliette Monaco as Cecile's Sister
 Tasha Guevara as Cecile's Sister
 Mookie Wilson as Father Morton
 Howard W. Overshown as Officer in Blue
 Danielle Stefania as Teenage girlfriend
 Anthony Padula as Big Ed
 Volney Stefflre as Badass Friend
 Raul Aranas as Philosopher
 Matthew Eckhardt as Young Man at Funeral
 Deana Perez as Funeral Mourner
 Salomé M. Krell as Officer Cabrera
 Ratnesh Dubey as Store Clerk
 Susan Montez as Bar Patron
 Isabella Roche as Crosseyed Mary
 Indika Senanayake as Store Owner

Production
Principal photography took place in May and June 2015 in Corona, New York, and Whitestone, New York.

References

External links
 

2017 comedy films
2017 films
American comedy films
American independent films
2010s English-language films
2010s American films